Nikki Clan is a Mexican Pop rock band from Nogales, Sonora and Mexicali, Baja California. It is formed by Yadira Gianola (lead vocals), Alberto Espinosa (bass guitar), José Antonio Dabdoub (guitar), Ángel Yáñez (guitar), and José Carlos Fausto Monroy (drums). It was created in 2005 by known producer Abelardo Vázquez (also producer of Reik), and released its first album in 2006. The self-titled album, Nikki Clan, is part of a five-album contract with Sony BMG. "Mirame" (Look at me) was released as the first single with tremendous success.
Its name is in honor of Nikki Sixx, an idol for Gianola.

Nikki Clan disbanded in 2010, following Gianola's first pregnancy, but they reunited in 2022 as part of the 2000's Pop Tour.

Discography

Nikki Clan (2006)
Charts: No. 20 (MEX), No. 10 (MEX POP)

Track listing
1. Mírame (Look at me)
2. Corazón abierto (Open heart)
3. No te amo (I don't love you)
4. Te siento (I feel you)
5. A mi lado (By my side)
6. No me digas que no (Don't tell me no)
7. Dame un día más (Give me one more day)
8. Dímelo a mí (Tell me)
9. Grita y llora (Scream and Cry)
10.Cómo me dejas así (How you leave me like this)
11.Celos (Jealous)
12.Qué más da (Whatever happens now)

Standard edition bonus tracks
13. No quiero verte (I don't want to see you)

Re-issue bonus tracks
13. No quiero verte (I don't want to see you)
14. Niñas mal (Bad girls)

No será igual (2008)

Track listing

1. No Será Igual (It Won't Be The Same)
2. Yo No Te Puedo Olvidar (I Can't Forget You)
3. Ya No Tengas Miedo (Don't Be Afraid)
4. Te Quiero Tanto (I Want You So Much)
5. Cuando (When)
6. Esta noche te voy a besar (This night i'm going to kiss you)
7. Pensando en ti (Thinking about you)
8. No Sabes Dar Amor (You Don't Know How to Give Love)
9. Las Curvas De Esa chica (This Chick's Curves)
10. Después De Todo (After Everything)
11. Solo para mí (Only mine)
12. Sin Ti (Without You)

Films
The song "Niñas mal" (Bad girls) was used on the Mexican film "Niñas Mal".

External links
 Official Site
 Fan Site
 MSN Group
 MySpace

Mexican pop music groups
Musical groups established in 2005
People from Nogales, Sonora
Power pop groups